Orozco is a surname of Spanish/Basque origin. Notable people with the surname include:

 Ana María Orozco (born 1973), Colombian television actress 
 Andrés Orozco (born 1979), Colombian football defender
 Andrés Orozco-Estrada (born 1977), violinist and conductor
 Antonio Orozco (born 1972), Spanish singer-songwriter
 Aurora Estrada Orozco (1918–2011), Mexican American community leader
 Caleb Orozco, LGBT activist in Belize
 Daniel Orozco, an American writer of fiction 
 Danilo Orozco (1944–2013), Cuban musicologist
 Edwin Orozco (born 1982), Colombian road cyclist
 Esther Orozco (born 1945), Mexican biologist and researcher
 Ezequiel Orozco (1988–2018), Mexican football player
 Gabriel Orozco (born 1962), Mexican postminimalist artist
 Germán Orozco (born 1976), Argentine field hockey defender 
 John Orozco (born 1992), American gymnast 
 Jonathan Orozco, Mexican football player
 José Clemente Orozco (1883–1949), Mexican painter
 Juan Orozco, Spanish luthier and guitar impresario, famous guitar shop in New York (1970s to 1990s)
 Lisseth Orozco (born 1986), Colombian judoka
 Michael Orozco (born 1986), American soccer player
 Olga Orozco (1920–1999), Argentine poet
 Pascual Orozco (sometimes spelled Oroszco) (1882–1915), Mexican revolutionary leader 
 Rafael Orozco (disambiguation), several people
 Soledad Orozco de Avila Camacho, first lady of Mexico (1940–1946); her husband was Manuel Avila Camacho
 Verónica Orozco, Colombian actress and singer, Ana María Orozco sister

References

Basque-language surnames
Basque toponymic surnames